Panorama in Interlingua is the primary periodical for the language Interlingua, published bimonthly.  It was first issued in January 1988. The magazine is based in Odense, Denmark, and is written completely in Interlingua and the activities of the Union Mundial pro Interlingua (UMI) appear in each issue, but the content is not necessarily about the language itself. Thomas Breinstrup, the editor in chief, is considered a leader of Interlingua style. 

The stated aim of the publication is to carry:
news of Interlingua
journalism
news reports
book reviews
travel news and articles
chronicles

References

External links
Panorama in Interlingua

1988 establishments in Denmark
Bi-monthly magazines published in Denmark
Magazines published in Denmark
Interlingua-language magazines
Magazines established in 1988
Mass media in Odense